Bagawad is a village in Dharwad district of Karnataka, India.

Demographics 
As of the 2011 Census of India there were 103 households in Bagawad and a total population of 470 consisting of 238 males and 232 females. There were 57 children ages 0-6.

References

Villages in Dharwad district